Riptide (Janos Quested) is a supervillain appearing in American comic books published by Marvel Comics, usually those related to the X-Men franchise. 

He was portrayed by Álex González in the film X-Men: First Class.

Publication history

Riptide first appeared in Uncanny X-Men #211 (November 1986), and was created by Chris Claremont, John Romita Jr., and Dan Green.

The character subsequently appears in The Uncanny X-Men #240-241 (January–February 1989), #243 (April 1989), X-Man #13 (March 1996), Gambit #9 (October 1999), X-Men and Power Pack #4 (March 2006), X-Men #200-203 (August–November 2007), New X-Men #44-45 (January 2008), X-Men #205-206 (January–February 2008), New X-Men #46 (March 2008), and X-Factor #27 (March 2008).

Riptide appeared as part of the "Marauders" entry in the Official Handbook of the Marvel Universe Deluxe Edition #18.

Fictional character biography
Riptide is a member of the Marauders, a team of villains brought together by the mutant thief Gambit at the request of Mister Sinister.

After Sinister dispatched the Marauders into the sewers under New York City to kill the subterranean mutant collective known as the Morlocks, Riptide was responsible for severely injuring X-Men members Nightcrawler and Colossus. Having seen the results of Riptide's actions (Riptide's mutant power to launch barrages of sharp projectiles had enabled him to kill more Morlocks at any given single moment than any other Marauder), Colossus had been pushed close to his emotional breaking point. Colossus was further enraged and grieved when Riptide badly injured Nightcrawler, and finally snapped when Harpoon maimed his former girlfriend, Shadowcat. Colossus lunged at Harpoon to mete out vengeance, but Riptide got in his way, believing that his power would fell the Russian mutant. He boasted to Colossus that hurricane force winds could punch a piece of straw through a solid oak and that his spinning caused his blades to fly even faster than that. Despite being hit by a deluge of blades which penetrated his armored skin, Colossus managed to reach an incredulous Riptide, seize his throat, and snap his neck. However, Mr. Sinister was able to clone the Marauders thanks to samples of their DNA, and Riptide returned to die once more during the event known as the Inferno.

Another band of cloned Marauders, including Riptide, later attacked the mutant known as Threnody but were defeated by Nate Grey, the X-Man. A team of Marauders clones also defended one of Mr. Sinister's secret bases against an incursion by Gambit, the mutant Courier, and Sabretooth.

After M-Day
After the events of M-Day, in which a mentally ill Scarlet Witch removed the mutant gene from the majority of the world's mutant population, Riptide's clone retained his powers. Riptide's clone returns alongside the new Marauders.

Riptide assists Mister Sinister in his attempts to eliminate mutants with knowledge of the future. Riptide kills Quiet Bill while both are in an elevator.

Later, during the storyline "Messiah Complex", he is part of the final battle on Muir Isle. He seems to be aware of the fact his neck had been broken before. He battles the wolf-girl Wolfsbane, knocking her out and giving her superficial wounds before he is rendered unconscious by Professor X.

Powers and abilities
Riptide is a mutant with the ability to spin his body at an incredibly fast rate. He also has the ability to generate calcium growth from his bones that protrude through his skin, often taking the form of shurikens and spikes. When he spins, Riptide can release these growths at will from his skin, the additional velocity that comes from his spinning making them lethal missiles that can even punch through steel.

In other media
 Riptide makes a non-speaking cameo appearance in a flashback in the Marvel Anime: X-Men episode "Armor - Awakening". This version is a young boy from South America who was trained by Emma Frost.
 Riptide appears in X-Men: First Class, portrayed by Álex González. This version is a member of the Hellfire Club. He assists the group in their plot to instigate the Cuban Missile Crisis and World War III until they are foiled by Charles Xavier and Erik Lensherr's fledgling X-Men and defects to Lehnsherr.

References

External links
 Uncannyxmen.net character bio on Riptide

Characters created by Chris Claremont
Characters created by John Romita Jr.
Clone characters in comics
Comics characters introduced in 1986
Fictional mercenaries in comics
Fictional murderers
Marvel Comics characters who can move at superhuman speeds
Marvel Comics mutants
Marvel Comics supervillains
Superhero film characters